Park Eun-sun ( or  ; born 25 December 1986) is a South Korean footballer who plays for Seoul City WFC in the WK League.

Career
In August 2014, Park joined WFC Rossiyanka.

References

External links
 

1986 births
Living people
South Korean women's footballers
South Korean expatriate footballers
Women's association football forwards
South Korea women's under-20 international footballers
South Korea women's international footballers
Expatriate women's footballers in Russia
South Korean expatriate sportspeople in Russia
WFC Rossiyanka players
2015 FIFA Women's World Cup players
WK League players
Asian Games bronze medalists for South Korea
Medalists at the 2010 Asian Games
Asian Games medalists in football
2003 FIFA Women's World Cup players
Universiade medalists in football
Universiade gold medalists for South Korea
Footballers at the 2010 Asian Games
21st-century South Korean women